Pudzian Band is a Polish disco polo and dance group founded in 2005 by the strongman Mariusz Pudzianowski and his younger brother Krystian. They had various tours in 2006 and 2007 and in one concert were seen by 190,000 people. The music video of their song "Zdobyć Świat" (Conquer the World) appeared in December 2006.

Band members
Mariusz Pudzianowski
Anna Brzozowska
Krystian Pudzianowski
Ross Tweedy

Álbum 
First record in Disco Polo style.

2013 - Tak To Czuję:

Singles

Official links 

 Official Web Site
 Official Fanpage Facebook

References

External links
 Pudzianband.pl Official site

Polish pop music groups